Charles J. Mehelich (August 4, 1922 – December 2, 1984) was an American football player.

A native of Oakmont, Pennsylvania, he played college football for the Duquesne Dukes. He was drafted by the Pittsburgh Steelers in the fifth round with the 33rd overall pick of the 1945 NFL Draft and played professional football in the National Football League (NFL) for the Steelers from 1946 to 1950. He appeared in a total of 59 NFL games, 33 as a starter. He caught 15 passes for 172 yards. He was selected by the Chicago Herald American as a first-team All Pro in 1947. He also served in the Navy and played in 1945 on the Fleet City football team.

Mehelich died on December 2, 1984, at Abington Memorial Hospital (AMH), in Abington, Pennsylvania.

References

External links
 

1922 births
1984 deaths
American football defensive ends
American football ends
Duquesne Dukes football players
Pittsburgh Steelers players
United States Navy personnel of World War II
People from Oakmont, Pennsylvania
Players of American football from Pennsylvania